Gradenje is a small settlement in the Municipality of Šmarješke Toplice in southeastern Slovenia. The municipality is included in the Southeast Slovenia Statistical Region and was part of the historical region of Lower Carniola.

References

External links
Gradenje at Geopedia

Populated places in the Municipality of Šmarješke Toplice